Gingham, also called Vichy check, is a medium-weight balanced plain-woven fabric typically with striped, check or plaid duotone patterns, in bright colour and in white made from dyed cotton or cotton-blend yarns. It is made of carded, medium or fine yarns.

History
The name may originate  Alternatively, it is speculated that the fabric now known as gingham may have been made at Guingamp, a town in Brittany, France, and that the fabric may be named after the town. Some sources say that the name came into English via Dutch. When originally imported into Europe in the 17th century, gingham was a striped fabric, though now it is distinguished by its checkered pattern. From the mid-18th century, when it was being produced in the mills of Manchester, England, it started to be woven into checked or plaid patterns (often blue and white). Checked gingham became more common over time, though striped gingham was still available in the late Victorian period. The equivalent in French is the noun vichy, from the town of Vichy, France. The same word is used in Spain, where this pattern is called "cuadro vichy" or "estampado vichy."

In the United States, the mass popularity of men's blue and white gingham-patterned shirts in the 2010s led to critical media coverage of the phenomenon.

Use 

Gingham fabric was popular to use in various dress material such as shirts, skirts, maxi and also for some home furnishing such as towels and curtains. Along with muslin, gingham is often used as a test fabric while designing fashion or used for making an inexpensive fitting shell prior to making the clothing in fashion fabric. Gingham shirts have been worn by mods since the 1960s and continue to be identified with fans of indie and mod music with brands like Lambretta Clothing, Ben Sherman, Fred Perry, Penguin and Merc producing gingham shirts.

In the United Kingdom, the gingham pattern is often used for younger girls' school uniforms.

In popular culture 

 The Eugene Field poem "The Duel" concerns a duel between a "gingham dog" and a "calico cat."
 In Tell Taylor's popular song "Down By the Old Mill Stream" (1908), "You" was "dressed in gingham, too."
 Brigitte Bardot famously wore a pink gingham dress when she got married. This started a trend which caused a shortage of this fabric in France.
 Manchester United F.C. wore a gingham-pattern shirt during the 2012–13 season.
 Dorothy Gale wore a blue gingham dress in the Wizard of Oz book and film.
 Mary Ann Summers on Gilligan's Island often wore a gingham dress.
 Bill Hicks made reference to gingham in his famous stand-up comedy routine in regard to Jack Palance from the 1953 movie Shane.
 Gingham dresses were standard attire for most female performers on the Grand Ole Opry until the 1960s, such that the dress code was jocularly known as the "Gingham Curtain" until Jeannie Seely pushed for its abolition.
 In Marty Robbins's Grammy-winning song "My Woman, My Woman, My Wife" (1970), he mentions his wife "in a dress made of gingham".
 In the Captain Beefheart song "My Human Gets Me Blues" from the album Trout Mask Replica (1969), he sings “I saw you baby, dancin' in your x-ray gingham dress.”
 Japanese girl group AKB48 used gingham as a general theme for their 2012 single "Gingham Check."
 The XTC song "Pink Thing" contains the line "If you could only see the way the gingham swirls."

See also 

 British country clothing
 Madras cloth
 Railroad stripe
 Gamucha
 Keffiyeh

Notes

References 
 Kadolph, Sara J., ed.: Textiles, 10th edition, Pearson/Prentice-Hall, 2007, 
 Material for Boys' Clothing: Gingham Vichy (optionally requires username and password to display images; press cancel until the box is gone)

Woven fabrics
Textile patterns